This is a list of North American mammals. It includes all mammals currently found in the United States, St. Pierre and Miquelon, Canada, Greenland, Bermuda, Mexico, Central America, and the Caribbean region, whether resident or as migrants.  This article does not include species found only in captivity. Mammal species which became extinct in the last 10,000 to 13,000 years are also included in this article. Each species is listed, with its binomial name. Most established introduced species occurring across multiple states and provinces are also noted.

Some species are identified as indicated below:

(A) = Accidental: occurrence based on one or a few records, and unlikely to occur regularly
(E) = Extinct: died out between 13,000 years ago and the present
(Ex) = Extirpated: no longer occurs in area of interest, but other populations exist elsewhere
(I) = Introduced: population established solely as result of direct or indirect human intervention; synonymous with non-native and non-indigenous

Conservation status - IUCN Red List of Threatened Species:
 - extinct,  - extinct in the wild
 - critically endangered,  - endangered,  - vulnerable
 - near threatened,  - least concern
 - data deficient,  - not evaluated
(v. 2013.2, the data is current as of March 5, 2014)
and Endangered Species Act:
 - endangered,  - threatened
,  - experimental non essential or essential population
,  - endangered or threatened due to similarity of appearance
(selected only taxa found in the US, the data is current as of March 28, 2014)

Didelphimorphia (opossums)

Didelphidae
Common opossum, Didelphis marsupialis 
Virginia opossum, Didelphis virginiana  
Derby's woolly opossum, Caluromys derbianus 
Bare-tailed woolly opossum, Caluromys philander   (Trinidad and Tobago)
Water opossum, Chironectes minimus 
Adler's woolly mouse opossum, Marmosa adleri 
Alston's mouse opossum, Marmosa alstoni  and:
Nicaraguan woolly mouse opossum, Marmosa nicaraguae 
Isthmian mouse opossum, Marmosa isthmica
Mexican mouse opossum, Marmosa mexicana  and:
Zeledon's mouse opossum, Marmosa zeledoni 
Linnaeus's mouse opossum, Marmosa murina   (Trinidad and Tobago)
Robinson's mouse opossum, Marmosa robinsoni 
Tschudi's slender opossum, Marmosops caucae  
Dusky slender opossum, Marmosops fuscatus  and:
Carr's slender opossum, Marmosops carri  (Trinidad and Tobago)
Panama slender opossum, Marmosops invictus 
Brown four-eyed opossum, Metachirus nudicaudatus  and:
Common brown four-eyed opossum, Metachirus myosuros 
Sepia short-tailed opossum, Monodelphis adusta 
Gray four-eyed opossum, Philander opossum  and:
Dark four-eyed opossum, Philander melanurus 
Northern four-eyed opossum, Philander vossi 
Balsas gray mouse opossum, Tlacuatzin balsasensis 
Grayish mouse opossum, Tlacuatzin canescens  and:
Yucatan gray mouse opossum, Tlacuatzin gaumeri 
Tres Marías gray mouse opossum, Tlacuatzin insularis 
Northern gray mouse opossum, Tlacuatzin sinaloae

Cingulata (armadillos)

Dasypodidae
Beautiful armadillo, Dasypus bellus (E)
Nine-banded armadillo, Dasypus novemcinctus

Chlamyphoridae
Northern naked-tailed armadillo, Cabassous centralis 
American glyptodont, Glyptotherium floridanum (E)

Pampatheriidae
American giant armadillo, Holmesina septentrionalis (E)

Pilosa: Vermilingua (anteaters and tamanduas)

Cyclopedidae
Common silky anteater, Cyclopes didactylus   (Trinidad and Tobago)
Central American silky anteater, Cyclopes dorsalis

Myrmecophagidae
Giant anteater, Myrmecophaga tridactyla 
Northern tamandua, Tamandua mexicana 
Southern tamandua, Tamandua tetradactyla   (Trinidad and Tobago)

Pilosa: Folivora (sloths)

Megalonychidae

Jefferson ground sloth, Megalonyx jeffersonii  (E)

Bradypodidae (three-toed sloths)
Pygmy three-toed sloth, Bradypus pygmaeus 
Brown-throated sloth, Bradypus variegatus

Choloepodidae (two-toed sloths)
Hoffmann's two-toed sloth, Choloepus hoffmanni

Megatheriidae
American giant ground sloth, Eremotherium laurillardi (E)

Mylodontidae
Harlan's ground sloth, Paramylodon harlani (E)

Nothrotheriidae
Shasta ground sloth, Nothrotheriops shastensis  (E)

Rodentia (rodents)

Echimyidae

Heteropsomyinae
Oriente cave rat, Boromys offella  (E)
Torre's cave rat, Boromys torrei  (E)
Hispaniolan edible rat, Brotomys voratus  (E)
Antillean cave rat, Heteropsomys antillensis (E)
Insular cave rat, Heteropsomys insulans (E)

Echimyinae
Rufous soft-furred spiny-rat, Diplomys labilis 
Armored rat, Hoplomys gymnurus 
Red-nosed armored tree-rat, Makalata didelphoides   (Trinidad and Tobago)
Tome's spiny-rat, Proechimys semispinosus 
Trinidad spiny-rat, Proechimys trinitatis   (Trinidad and Tobago)

Capromyinae (hutias)
Garrido's hutia, Capromys garridoi 
Desmarest's hutia, Capromys pilorides   and:
Gundlach's hutia, Capromys gundlachianus
Jamaican coney, Geocapromys brownii 
Cayman hutia, Geocapromys caymanensis (E) 
Cuban coney, Geocapromys columbianus (E) 
Bahamian hutia, Geocapromys ingrahami 
Little Swan Island hutia, Geocapromys thoracatus (E)
Imposter hutia, Hexolobodon phenax (E) 
Wide-toothed hutia, Hyperplagiodontia araeum (E) 
Montane hutia, Isolobodon montanus (E) 
Puerto Rican hutia, Isolobodon portoricensis (E) 
Cabrera's hutia, Mesocapromys angelcabrerai 
Eared hutia, Mesocapromys auritus 
Black-tailed hutia, Mesocapromys melanurus  
Dwarf hutia, Mesocapromys nana  
San Felipe hutia, Mesocapromys sanfelipensis 
Prehensile-tailed hutia, Mysateles prehensilis   and:
Isla De La Juventud tree hutia, Mysateles prehensilis meridionalis
Hispaniolan hutia, Plagiodontia aedium  or:
Small Haitian hutia, Plagiodontia spelaeum (E) 
Samaná hutia, Plagiodontia ipnaeum (E)
Lemke's hutia, Rhizoplagiodontia lemkei (E)

Aplodontiidae
Mountain beaver, Aplodontia rufa  
(ssp. A. r. nigra)

Castoridae (beavers)

North American beaver, Castor canadensis  
Giant beaver, Castoroides ohioensis  (E)

Zapodidae (jumping mice)
Eastern woodland jumping mouse, Napaeozapus insignis   and:
Western woodland jumping mouse, Napaeozapus abietorum 
Northern meadow jumping mouse, Zapus hudsonius  
(Preble's meadow jumping mouse,) and:
Southern meadow jumping mouse, Zapus luteus 
South-western jumping mouse, Zapus princeps   and:
Oregon jumping mouse, Zapus oregonus 
South Pacific jumping mouse, Zapus pacificus 
North-western jumping mouse, Zapus saltator 
North Pacific Jumping Mouse, Zapus trinotatus   and:
Central Pacific jumping mouse, Zapus montanus

Erethizontidae (New World porcupines)
Mexican hairy dwarf porcupine, Coendou mexicanus 
Brazilian porcupine, Coendou prehensilis  and:
Amazonian long-tailed porcupine, Coendou longicaudatus  (Trinidad and Tobago)
Andean porcupine, Coendou quichua 
North American porcupine, Erethizon dorsatum

Caviidae (cavy family)
Lesser capybara, Hydrochoerus isthmius 
Pinckney's capybara, Neochoerus pinckneyi (E)
Holmes's capybara, Neochoerus aesopi (E)

Heptaxodontidae (giant hutia)
Blunt-toothed giant hutia, Amblyrhiza inundata (E)
Osborn's key mouse, Clidomys osborni (E)
Plate-toothed giant hutia, Elasmodontomys obliquus (E)
Twisted-toothed mouse, Quemisia gravis (E)

Dasyproctidae
Coiban agouti, Dasyprocta coibae 
Common red-rumped agouti, Dasyprocta leporina   (Trinidad and Tobago, introduced to Virgin Islands, U.S.)
Mexican agouti, Dasyprocta mexicana 
Central American agouti, Dasyprocta punctata 
Ruatan Island agouti, Dasyprocta ruatanica

Cuniculidae
Lowland paca, Cuniculus paca

Geomyidae (pocket gophers)
There has been much debate among taxonomists about which races of pocket gopher should be recognized as full species, and the following list cannot be regarded as definitive.

Yellow-faced pocket gopher, Cratogeomys castanops  
Oriental Basin pocket gopher, Cratogeomys fulvescens 
Smoky pocket gopher, Cratogeomys fumosus  and:
Volcan de Toluca pocket gopher, Cratogeomys planiceps  
Goldman's pocket gopher, Cratogeomys goldmani 
Merriam's pocket gopher, Cratogeomys merriami 
Perote pocket gopher, Cratogeomys perotensis 
Desert pocket gopher, Geomys arenarius  
Attwater's pocket gopher, Geomys attwateri  
Baird's pocket gopher, Geomys breviceps  
Plains pocket gopher, Geomys bursarius   and:
Hall's pocket gopher, Geomys jugossicularis 
Sand Hills pocket gopher, Geomys lutescens 
Knox Jones's pocket gopher, Geomys knoxjonesi  
Texas pocket gopher, Geomys personatus   and:
Strecker's pocket gopher, Geomys streckeri 
Southeastern pocket gopher, Geomys pinetis  
Llano pocket gopher, Geomys texensis  
Tropical pocket gopher, Geomys tropicalis 
Chiriqui pocket gopher, Heterogeomys cavator  
Cherrie's pocket gopher, Heterogeomys cherriei  
Darien pocket gopher, Heterogeomys dariensis  
Variable pocket gopher, Heterogeomys heterodus  
Hispid pocket gopher, Heterogeomys hispidus  
Big pocket gopher, Heterogeomys lanius  
Underwood's pocket gopher, Heterogeomys underwoodi  
Giant pocket gopher, Orthogeomys grandis   and:
Oaxacan pocket gopher, Orthogeomys cuniculus 
Botta's pocket gopher, Thomomys bottae  
Camas pocket gopher, Thomomys bulbivorus  
Wyoming pocket gopher, Thomomys clusius  
Idaho pocket gopher, Thomomys idahoensis  
Mazama pocket gopher, Thomomys mazama  
Mountain pocket gopher, Thomomys monticola  
Nayar pocket gopher, Thomomys nayarensis 
Northern pocket gopher, Thomomys talpoides  
Townsend's pocket gopher, Thomomys townsendii  
Southern pocket gopher, Thomomys umbrinus   and:
Black-and-brown pocket gopher, Thomomys atrovarius 
Sierra Madre occidental pocket gopher, Thomomys sheldoni 
Alcorn's pocket gopher, Pappogeomys alcorni 
Buller's pocket gopher, Pappogeomys bulleri 
Michoacan pocket gopher, Zygogeomys trichopus

Heteromyidae

California kangaroo rat, Dipodomys californicus  
Gulf Coast kangaroo rat, Dipodomys compactus  
Desert kangaroo rat, Dipodomys deserti  
Texas kangaroo rat, Dipodomys elator  
San Quintin kangaroo rat, Dipodomys gravipes 
Heermann's kangaroo rat, Dipodomys heermanni  
(Morro Bay kangaroo rat,)
Giant kangaroo rat, Dipodomys ingens   
Merriam's kangaroo rat, Dipodomys merriami  
(San Bernardino kangaroo rat,)
Chisel-toothed kangaroo rat, Dipodomys microps  
Nelson's kangaroo rat, Dipodomys nelsoni 
Fresno kangaroo rat, Dipodomys nitratoides  
(Fresno subspecies D. n. exilis and Tipton kangaroo rat,)
Ord's kangaroo rat, Dipodomys ordii  
Panamint kangaroo rat, Dipodomys panamintinus  
Phillips's kangaroo rat, Dipodomys phillipsii  and:
Plateau kangaroo rat, Dipodomys ornatus  
Dulzura kangaroo rat, Dipodomys simulans  
Banner-tailed kangaroo rat, Dipodomys spectabilis  
Stephens's kangaroo rat, Dipodomys stephensi   
Narrow-faced kangaroo rat, Dipodomys venustus   
Big-eared kangaroo rat, Dipodomys (venustus) elephantinus 
Agile kangaroo rat, Dipodomys agilis  
Panamanian spiny pocket mouse, Heteromys adspersus 
Trinidad spiny pocket mouse, Heteromys anomalus   (Trinidad and Tobago)
Southern spiny pocket mouse, Heteromys australis 
Desmarest's spiny pocket mouse, Heteromys desmarestianus  and:
Goldman's spiny pocket mouse, Heteromys goldmani 
Gaumer's spiny pocket mouse, Heteromys gaumeri 
Mexican spiny pocket mouse, Heteromys irroratus   and:
Buller's spiny pocket mouse, Heteromys bulleri 
Nelson's spiny pocket mouse, Heteromys nelsoni 
Cloud-dwelling spiny pocket mouse, Heteromys nubicolens 
Mountain spiny pocket mouse, Heteromys oresterus  
Painted spiny pocket mouse, Heteromys pictus 
Salvin's spiny pocket mouse, Heteromys salvini 
Jaliscan spiny pocket mouse, Heteromys spectabilis 
Dark kangaroo mouse, Microdipodops megacephalus  
Pale kangaroo mouse, Microdipodops pallidus  
White-eared pocket mouse, Perognathus alticola  
Arizona pocket mouse, Perognathus amplus  
Olive-backed pocket mouse, Perognathus fasciatus  
Plains pocket mouse, Perognathus flavescens  
Silky pocket mouse, Perognathus flavus  
San Joaquin pocket mouse, Perognathus inornatus  
Little pocket mouse, Perognathus longimembris  
(Pacific pocket mouse,)
Merriam's pocket mouse, Perognathus merriami  
Columbia Plateau pocket mouse, Perognathus parvus   and:
Great Basin pocket mouse, Perognathus mollipilosus 
Little desert pocket mouse, Chaetodipus arenarius  and:
Cerralvo Island pocket mouse, Chaetodipus siccus  
Narrow-skulled pocket mouse, Chaetodipus artus 
Bailey's pocket mouse, Chaetodipus baileyi  
California pocket mouse, Chaetodipus californicus  
Nelson's pocket mouse, Chaetodipus nelsoni   and:
Highland coarse-haired pocket mouse, Chaetodipus collis 
Dalquest's pocket mouse, Chaetodipus ammophilus   and:
Dalquest's pocket mouse, Chaetodipus (ammophilus) dalquesti 
Durango coarse-haired pocket mouse, Chaetodipus durangae 
Chihuahuan pocket mouse, Chaetodipus eremicus  
San Diego pocket mouse, Chaetodipus fallax  
Long-tailed pocket mouse, Chaetodipus formosus  
Goldman's pocket mouse, Chaetodipus goldmani 
Hispid pocket mouse, Chaetodipus hispidus  
Rock pocket mouse, Chaetodipus intermedius  
Lined pocket mouse, Chaetodipus lineatus 
Desert pocket mouse, Chaetodipus penicillatus  
Sinaloan pocket mouse, Chaetodipus pernix 
Baja pocket mouse, Chaetodipus rudinoris  
Spiny pocket mouse, Chaetodipus spinatus

Sciuridae (squirrels)

Xerinae: Marmotini (ground squirrels)
Harris's antelope squirrel, Ammospermophilus harrisii  
Espíritu Santo antelope squirrel, Ammospermophilus insularis
Texas antelope squirrel, Ammospermophilus interpres  
White-tailed antelope squirrel, Ammospermophilus leucurus  
San Joaquin antelope squirrel, Ammospermophilus nelsoni  
Golden-mantled ground squirrel, Callospermophilus lateralis  
Sierra Madre ground squirrel, Callospermophilus madrensis 
Cascade golden-mantled ground squirrel, Callospermophilus saturatus  
Gunnison's prairie dog, Cynomys gunnisoni  
White-tailed prairie dog, Cynomys leucurus  
Black-tailed prairie dog, Cynomys ludovicianus  
Utah prairie dog, Cynomys parvidens   
Mexican prairie dog, Cynomys mexicanus 
Mexican ground squirrel, Ictidomys mexicanus   and:
Rio Grande ground squirrel, Ictidomys parvidens 
Thirteen-lined ground squirrel, Ictidomys tridecemlineatus  
Alaska marmot, Marmota broweri  
Hoary marmot, Marmota caligata  
Yellow-bellied marmot, Marmota flaviventris  
Woodchuck, Marmota monax  
Olympic marmot, Marmota olympus  
Vancouver Island marmot, Marmota vancouverensis   
Alpine chipmunk, Neotamias alpinus  
Yellow pine chipmunk, Neotamias amoenus   and:
Crater chipmunk, Neotamias cratericus 
Buller's chipmunk, Neotamias bulleri 
Gray-footed chipmunk, Neotamias canipes  
Gray-collared chipmunk, Neotamias cinereicollis  
Cliff chipmunk, Neotamias dorsalis  
Durango chipmunk, Neotamias durangae  and:
Sierra del Carmen chipmunk, Neotamias solivagus 
Merriam's chipmunk, Neotamias merriami  
Least chipmunk, Neotamias minimus   and:
Coulee chipmunk, Neotamias grisescens 
California chipmunk, Neotamias obscurus  
Yellow-cheeked chipmunk, Neotamias ochrogenys  
Palmer's chipmunk, Neotamias palmeri  
Panamint chipmunk, Neotamias panamintinus  
Long-eared chipmunk, Neotamias quadrimaculatus  
Colorado chipmunk, Neotamias quadrivittatus  
Red-tailed chipmunk, Neotamias ruficaudus  
Hopi chipmunk, Neotamias rufus  
Allen's chipmunk, Neotamias senex  
Siskiyou chipmunk, Neotamias siskiyou  
Sonoma chipmunk, Neotamias sonomae  
Lodgepole chipmunk, Neotamias speciosus  
Eastern chipmunk, Tamias striatus  
Townsend's chipmunk, Neotamias townsendii  
Uinta chipmunk, Neotamias umbrinus  
Tropical ground squirrel, Notocitellus adocetus 
Ring-tailed ground squirrel, Notocitellus annulatus 
Baja California rock squirrel, Otospermophilus atricapillus 
California ground squirrel, Otospermophilus beecheyi   and:
Douglas's ground squirrel, Otospermophilus douglasii 
Rock squirrel, Otospermophilus variegatus  
Franklin's ground squirrel, Poliocitellus franklinii  
Uinta ground squirrel, Urocitellus armatus  
Belding's ground squirrel, Urocitellus beldingi  
Northern Idaho ground squirrel, Urocitellus brunneus   and:
Southern Idaho ground squirrel, Urocitellus endemicus  
Columbian ground squirrel, Urocitellus columbianus  
Wyoming ground squirrel, Urocitellus elegans  
Arctic ground squirrel, Urocitellus parryii  
Richardson's ground squirrel, Urocitellus richardsonii  
Townsend's ground squirrel, Urocitellus townsendii  
Townsend's ground squirrel, Urocitellus (townsendii) nancyae  
Merriam's ground squirrel, Urocitellus canus  
Piute ground squirrel, Urocitellus mollis  
Washington ground squirrel, Urocitellus washingtoni  
Mohave ground squirrel, Xerospermophilus mohavensis  
Perote ground squirrel, Xerospermophilus perotensis 
Spotted ground squirrel, Xerospermophilus spilosoma  
Round-tailed ground squirrel, Xerospermophilus tereticaudus

Sciurinae: Pteromyini (flying squirrels)
Northern flying squirrel, Glaucomys sabrinus  
(Carolina northern flying squirrel G. s. coloratus and Virginia northern flying squirrel G. s. fuscus)
Humboldt's flying squirrel, Glaucomys oregonensis 
Southern flying squirrel, Glaucomys volans

Sciurinae: Sciurini
Central American dwarf squirrel, Microsciurus alfari 
Western dwarf squirrel, Microsciurus mimulus 
Abert's squirrel, Sciurus aberti  
Allen's squirrel, Sciurus alleni 
Arizona gray squirrel, Sciurus arizonensis  
Mexican gray squirrel, Sciurus aureogaster  
Eastern gray squirrel, Sciurus carolinensis  
Collie's squirrel, Sciurus colliaei 
Deppe's squirrel, Sciurus deppei 
Red-tailed squirrel, Sciurus granatensis  and:
Richmond's squirrel, Sciurus richmondi  
Western gray squirrel, Sciurus griseus  
Mexican fox squirrel, Sciurus nayaritensis  
Fox squirrel, Sciurus niger  
(Delmarva fox squirrel,)
Peters's squirrel, Sciurus oculatus 
Variegated squirrel, Sciurus variegatoides 
Yucatan squirrel, Sciurus yucatanensis 
Bangs's mountain squirrel, Syntheosciurus brochus 
Douglas squirrel, Tamiasciurus douglasii  
Mearn's squirrel, T. d. mearnsi 
Southwestern red squirrel, Tamiasciurus fremonti   
(Mount Graham red squirrel,)
North American red squirrel, Tamiasciurus hudsonicus  
(Mount Graham red squirrel,)

Cricetidae
There has been much debate among taxonomists about which races of mice and voles should be recognized as full species, and the following list cannot be regarded as definitive.

Arvicolinae
Root vole, Alexandromys oeconomus  
White-footed vole, Arborimus albipes  
Red tree vole, Arborimus longicaudus  
California red tree mouse, Arborimus pomo  
Western red-backed vole, Clethrionomys californicus  
Southern red-backed vole, Clethrionomys gapperi  
Northern red-backed vole, Clethrionomys rutilus  
Northern collared lemming, Dicrostonyx groenlandicus  
Ungava collared lemming, Dicrostonyx hudsonius  
Richardson's collared lemming, Dicrostonyx richardsoni  
Nelson's collared lemming, Dicrostonyx nelsoni  
Ogilvie Mountains collared lemming, Dicrostonyx nunatakensis  
Unalaska collared lemming, Dicrostonyx unalascensis  
Sagebrush vole, Lemmiscus curtatus  
Nearctic brown lemming, Lemmus trimucronatus   and:
Beringian brown lemming, Lemmus nigripes 
Insular vole, Microtus abbreviatus  and:
Singing vole, Microtus miurus  
California vole, Microtus californicus  
()
Gray-tailed vole, Microtus canicaudus  
Rock vole, Microtus chrotorrhinus  
Western meadow vole, Microtus drummondii 
Florida salt marsh vole, Microtus dukecampbelli 
Guatemalan vole, Microtus guatemalensis 
Long-tailed vole, Microtus longicaudus  
Mexican vole, Microtus mexicanus  (including M. mogollonensis: ,) and:
Mogollon vole, Microtus mogollonensis 
Montane vole, Microtus montanus  
Prairie vole, Microtus ochrogaster  
Creeping vole, Microtus oregoni  
Eastern meadow vole, Microtus pennsylvanicus   and:
Beach vole, M. p. breweri  
Western meadow vole, Microtus drummondii 
Florida salt marsh vole, Microtus dukecampbelli 
Woodland vole, Microtus pinetorum  
Water vole, Microtus richardsoni  
Tarabundi vole, Microtus oaxacensis  
Townsend's vole, Microtus townsendii  
Jalapan pine vole, Microtus quasiater 
Zempoaltépec vole, Microtus umbrosus 
Taiga vole, Microtus xanthognathus  
Round-tailed muskrat, Neofiber alleni  
Muskrat, Ondatra zibethicus  
Western heather vole, Phenacomys intermedius  
Eastern heather vole, Phenacomys ungava  
Northern bog lemming, Synaptomys borealis  
Southern bog lemming, Synaptomys cooperi

Neotominae
Mexican pygmy mouse, Baiomys musculus  and:
Southern pygmy mouse, Baiomys brunneus 
Northern pygmy mouse, Baiomys taylori  
Chinanteco deer mouse, Habromys chinanteco 
Delicate deer mouse, Habromys delicatulus 
Ixtlán deer mouse, Habromys ixtlani 
Zempoaltepec deer mouse, Habromys lepturus 
Crested-tailed deer mouse, Habromys lophurus 
Habromys schmidlyi 
Jico deer mouse, Habromys simulatus 
Oaxacan big-toothed deermouse, Megadontomys cryophilus  
Nelson's big-toothed deermouse, Megadontomys nelsoni  
Thomas's big-toothed deermouse, Megadontomys thomasi  
Goldman's diminutive woodrat, Nelsonia goldmani 
Diminutive woodrat, Nelsonia neotomodon 
Anthony's woodrat, Neotoma anthonyi (E)
White-throated woodrat, Neotoma albigula   and:
Black-tailed woodrat, Neotoma melanura 
Tamaulipan woodrat, Neotoma angustapalata  
Bryant's woodrat, Neotoma bryanti  
Bunker's woodrat, Neotoma bunkeri (E)
Nicaraguan woodrat, Neotoma chrysomelas  
Bushy-tailed woodrat, Neotoma cinerea  
Arizona woodrat, Neotoma devia  
Eastern woodrat, Neotoma floridana  
(Key Largo woodrat,)
Dusky-footed woodrat, Neotoma fuscipes  
()
Goldman's woodrat, Neotoma goldmani  
Desert woodrat, Neotoma lepida   and:
Angel de la Guarda woodrat, Neotoma insularis  
White-toothed woodrat, Neotoma leucodon  
Big-eared woodrat, Neotoma macrotis  
Allegheny woodrat, Neotoma magister  
San Martín Island woodrat, Neotoma martinensis (E)
Mexican woodrat, Neotoma mexicana   and:
Guatemala woodrat, Neotoma ferruginea 
Painted woodrat, Neotoma picta 
Nelson's woodrat, Neotoma nelsoni  
Southern Plains woodrat, Neotoma micropus  
Bolaños woodrat, Neotoma palatina  
Sonoran woodrat, Neotoma phenax  
Stephen's woodrat, Neotoma stephensi  
Volcano deermouse, Neotomodon alstoni  
Golden mouse, Ochrotomys nuttalli  
Mearn's grasshopper mouse, Onychomys arenicola  
Northern grasshopper mouse, Onychomys leucogaster  
Southern grasshopper mouse, Onychomys torridus  
Osgood's deermouse, Osgoodomys banderanus  
Peromyscus anayapahensis  (E)
Texas mouse, Peromyscus attwateri  
Aztec mouse, Peromyscus aztecus  and:
Cordillera deermouse, Peromyscus cordillerae 
Baker's deermouse, Peromyscus bakeri 
Brush mouse, Peromyscus boylii  
Orizaba deermouse, Peromyscus beatae  
Perote deermouse, Peromyscus bullatus  
California mouse, Peromyscus californicus  
Monserrat Island deermouse, Peromyscus caniceps  
Carleton's deermouse, Peromyscus carletoni 
Carol Patton's deermouse, Peromyscus carolpattonae 
Canyon mouse, Peromyscus crinitus  
Dickey's deermouse, Peromyscus dickeyi  
Southern rock deermouse, Peromyscus difficilis  or:
Oaxacan rock deermouse, Peromyscus amplus 
Felipe's rock deermouse, Peromyscus felipensis 
Ensink's deermouse, Peromyscus ensinki 
Cactus mouse, Peromyscus eremicus  
Southern baja deermouse, Peromyscus eva  
Northern Baja deer mouse, Peromyscus fraterculus  
Blackish deermouse, Peromyscus furvus   and:
Wide-rostrum deermouse, Peromyscus latirostris 
Gardner's deermouse, Peromyscus gardneri 
Cotton mouse, Peromyscus gossypinus  
()
Big deer mouse, Peromyscus grandis 
Guatemalan deer mouse, Peromyscus guatemalensis 
Osgood's mouse, Peromyscus gratus  
Greenbaum's deermouse, Peromyscus greenbaumi 
La Guarda deermouse, Peromyscus guardia  
Naked-eared deer mouse, Peromyscus gymnotis 
Hooper's deermouse, Peromyscus hooperi  
Transvolcanic deermouse, Peromyscus hylocetes  
Northwestern deer mouse, Peromyscus keeni  
Kilpatrick's deermouse, Peromyscus kilpatricki 
southern white-ankled mouse, Peromyscus pectoralis   and:
Northern white-ankled deermouse Peromyscus laceianus 
White-footed mouse, Peromyscus leucopus  
Nimble-footed mouse, Peromyscus levipes 
Tres Marias deermouse, Peromyscus madrensis  
Eastern deermouse, Peromyscus maniculatus   and:
Yukon deermouse, Peromyscus arcticus 
Gambel's deermouse, Peromyscus gambelii 
Southern deermouse, Peromyscus labecula 
Western deermouse, Peromyscus sonoriensis 
Mayan deermouse, Peromyscus mayensis  
Broad-faced deermouse, Peromyscus megalops  
Puebla deermouse, Peromyscus mekisturus  
Black-wristed deermouse, Peromyscus melanocarpus  
Black-eared mouse, Peromyscus melanotis  
Plateau deermouse, Peromyscus melanophrys   and:
Tehuantepec deermouse, Peromyscus leucurus 
Small-footed deermouse, Peromyscus micropus 
Zamora deermouse, Peromyscus zamorae 
Black-tailed deermouse, Peromyscus melanurus  
Mesquite mouse, Peromyscus merriami  
Mexican deer mouse, Peromyscus mexicanus  and:
Nicaraguan deermouse, Peromyscus nicaraguae 
Talamancan deermouse, Peromyscus nudipes 
Salvadorean deermouse, Peromyscus salvadorensis 
Chimoxan deermouse, Peromyscus tropicalis 
Totontepec deermouse, Peromyscus totontepecus 
Northern rock mouse, Peromyscus nasutus  
Giant island deer mouse, Peromyscus nesodytes  (E)
El Carrizo deermouse, Peromyscus ochraventer  
Southern white-ankled deermouse, Peromyscus pectoralis  or:
Tamaulipas white-ankled deermouse, Peromyscus collinus 
Pemberton's deermouse, Peromyscus pembertoni (E)  
Tawny deermouse, Peromyscus perfulvus   and:
Jalisco deermouse, Peromyscus chrysopus 
Oldfield mouse, Peromyscus polionotus  
(Choctawhatchee beach mouse, P. p. allophrys, Perdido Key beach mouse, P. p. trissyllepsis, St. Andrews beach mouse, P. p. peninsularis, Alabama beach mouse, P. p. ammobates and Anastasia Island beach mouse, P. p. phasma: , Southeastern beach mouse,)
Chihuahuan deermouse, Peromyscus polius  
Purepechus deermouse, Peromyscus purepechus 
La Palma field mouse, Peromyscus sagax 
Schmidly's deer mouse, Peromyscus schmidlyi 
Santa Cruz mouse, Peromyscus sejugis 
Nayarit mouse, Peromyscus simulus 
Slevin's mouse, Peromyscus slevini 
Gleaning mouse, Peromyscus spicilegus 
San Esteban Island mouse, Peromyscus stephani 
Stirton's deer mouse|Stirton's deermouse, Peromyscus stirtoni  
Pinyon mouse, Peromyscus truei  
Winkelmann's mouse, Peromyscus winkelmanni 
Yucatan deer mouse, Peromyscus yucatanicus 
Chiapan deer mouse, Peromyscus zarhynchus 
Florida mouse, Podomys floridanus  
Short-nosed harvest mouse, Reithrodontomys brevirostris  
Sonoran harvest mouse, Reithrodontomys burti  
Volcano harvest mouse, Reithrodontomys chrysopsis  
Talamancan harvest mouse, Reithrodontomys creper  
Darien harvest mouse, Reithrodontomys darienensis  
Fulvous harvest mouse, Reithrodontomys fulvescens  
Slender harvest mouse, Reithrodontomys gracilis  
Hairy harvest mouse, Reithrodontomys hirsutus  
Eastern harvest mouse, Reithrodontomys humulis  
Western harvest mouse, Reithrodontomys megalotis  
Small-toothed harvest mouse, Reithrodontomys microdon   and:
Oaxacan highlands harvest mouse, Reithrodontomys albilabris 
Mexican harvest mouse, Reithrodontomys mexicanus   and:
Costa Rican harvest mouse, Reithrodontomys cherrii 
Chiriquian harvest mouse, Reithrodontomys garichensis 
Plains harvest mouse, Reithrodontomys montanus  
Musser's harvest mouse, Reithrodontomys musseri  
Nicaraguan harvest mouse, Reithrodontomys paradoxus  
Salt marsh harvest mouse, Reithrodontomys raviventris   
Rodriguez's harvest mouse, Reithrodontomys rodriguezi  
Cozumel harvest mouse, Reithrodontomys spectabilis  
Sumichrast's harvest mouse, Reithrodontomys sumichrasti  
Narrow-nosed harvest mouse, Reithrodontomys tenuirostris  
Wagner's harvest mouse, Reithrodontomys wagneri 
Zacatecan harvest mouse, Reithrodontomys zacatecae  
Alston's brown mouse, Scotinomys teguina 
Chiriqui brown mouse, Scotinomys xerampelinus 
Magdalena woodrat, Xenomys nelsoni

Sigmodontinae
Lesser Antillean rice rat, Antillomys rayi (E) 
Hummelinck's vesper mouse, Calomys hummelincki   (Aruba and Curaçao)
Alfaro's rice rat, Handleyomys alfaroi  
Chapman's rice rat, Handleyomys chapmani  
Guerrero rice rat, Handleyomys guerrerensis 
Black-eared rice rat, Handleyomys melanotis  
Highland rice rat, Handleyomys rhabdops  
Long-nosed rice rat, Handleyomys rostratus  
Cloud forest rice rat, Handleyomys saturatior  
Allen's woodrat, Hodomys alleni  
Azara's rice rat, Hylaeamys megacephalus   (Trinidad and Tobago)
Tweedy's crab-eating rat, Ichthyomys tweedii 
Yellow isthmus rat, Isthmomys flavidus 
Mount Pirri isthmus rat, Isthmomys pirrensis 
Dusky rice rat Melanomys caliginosus  or:
Black-and-yellow rice rat, Melanomys chrysomelas 
Cinnamon-rufous rice rat, Melanomys idoneus 
Martinique giant rice rat, Megalomys desmarestii (E) 
Barbados giant rice rat, Megalomys georginae (E) 
Saint Lucia giant rice rat, Megalomys luciae (E) 
Painted bristly mouse, Neacomys pictus 
Northern akodont, Necromys urichi   (Trinidad and Tobago)
Trinidad water rat, Nectomys palmipes   (Trinidad and Tobago)
Boquete rice rat, Nephelomys devius  
White-throated rice rat, Nephelomys albigularis  or:
Mount Pirre rice rat, Nephelomys pirrensis 
Savanna arboreal rice rat, Oecomys speciosus   (Trinidad and Tobago)
Trinidad arboreal rice rat, Oecomys trinitatis 
White-bellied arboreal rice rat, Oecomys bicolor  
Fulvous pygmy rice rat, Oligoryzomys fulvescens   and:
Costa Rican pygmy rice rat, Oligoryzomys costaricensis 
Delicate pygmy rice rat, Oligoryzomys delicatus  (Trinidad and Tobago)
Sprightly pygmy rice rat, Oligoryzomys vegetus  
St. Vincent pygmy rice rat Oligoryzomys victus (E) 
Jamaican rice rat, Oryzomys antillarum (E) 
Coues's rice rat, Oryzomys couesi   and:
White-bellied marsh rice rat, Oryzomys albiventer 
Nicaraguan marsh rice rat, Oryzomys dimidiatus  
Nelson's rice rat, Oryzomys nelsoni (E) 
Common marsh rice rat, Oryzomys palustris   and:
Texas marsh rice rat, Oryzomys texensis 
Mexican water mouse, Rheomys mexicanus  
Goldman's water mouse, Rheomys raptor  
Thomas's water mouse, Rheomys thomasi  
Underwood's water mouse, Rheomys underwoodi  
Broad-footed climbing rat, Rhipidomys latimanus  
Coues's climbing rat, Rhipidomys couesi   (Trinidad and Tobago)
Splendid climbing rat, Rhipidomys nitela   (Trinidad and Tobago)
Venezuelan climbing mouse, Rhipidomys venezuelae 
Allen's cotton rat, Sigmodon alleni  
Burmeister's cotton rat, Sigmodon hirsutus  
Hispid cotton rat, Sigmodon hispidus  
White-eared cotton rat, Sigmodon leucotis  
Yellow-nosed cotton rat, Sigmodon ochrognathus  
Arizona cotton rat, Sigmodon arizonae  
Tawny-bellied cotton rat, Sigmodon fulviventer  
Jaliscan cotton rat, Sigmodon mascotensis 
Miahuatlán cotton rat, Sigmodon planifrons 
Toltec cotton rat, Sigmodon toltecus 
Montane cotton rat, Sigmodon zanjonensis 
Alfaro's water rat, Sigmodontomys alfari  
Bolivar rice rat, Transandinomys bolivaris 
Talamancan rice rat, Transandinomys talamancae 
Nevis rice rat, Pennatomys nivalis (E) 
Harris's rice rat, Tanyuromys aphrastus  
Short-tailed cane rat, Zygodontomys brevicauda

Tylomyinae
Sumichrast's vesper rat, Nyctomys sumichrasti 
Yucatan vesper rat, Otonyctomys hatti  
La Pera climbing rat, Ototylomys chiapensis 
Big-eared climbing rat, Ototylomys phyllotis  
Chiapan climbing rat, Tylomys bullaris 
Fulvous-bellied climbing rat, Tylomys fulviventer 
Peters's climbing rat, Tylomys nudicaudus 
Panamanian climbing rat, Tylomys panamensis 
Tumbala climbing rat, Tylomys tumbalensis 
Watson's climbing rat, Tylomys watsoni

Primates

Aotidae (night monkeys)
Panamanian night monkey, Aotus zonalis 
Hispaniola monkey, Antillothrix bernensis (E)
Haitian monkey, Insulacebus toussaintiana (E)
Paralouatta marianae (E)
Paralouatta varonai (E)
Jamaican monkey, Xenothrix mcgregori (E)

Atelidae
Ursine red howler, Alouatta arctoidea   (Trinidad and Tobago)
Coiba Island howler, Alouatta coibensis 
Guyanan red howler, Alouatta macconnelli 
Mantled howler, Alouatta palliata 
Guatemalan black howler, Alouatta pigra 
Black-headed spider monkey, Ateles fusciceps 
Geoffroy's spider monkey, Ateles geoffroyi

Callitrichidae
Geoffroy's tamarin, Saguinus geoffroyi

Cebidae
Brown weeper capuchin, Cebus brunneus   (Trinidad and Tobago)
Colombian white-faced capuchin, Cebus capucinus 
Panamanian white-faced capuchin, Cebus imitator 
Central American squirrel monkey, Saimiri oerstedii

Lagomorpha (rabbits and hares)

Leporidae (rabbits and hares)

Atzlan rabbit, Aztlanolagus agilis (E)
Pygmy rabbit, Sylvilagus idahoensis   
Antelope jackrabbit, Lepus alleni  
Tamaulipas jackrabbit, Lepus altamirae 
Snowshoe hare, Lepus americanus  
Arctic hare, Lepus arcticus  
Black-tailed jackrabbit, Lepus californicus  
White-sided jackrabbit, Lepus callotis  
Tehuantepec jackrabbit, Lepus flavigularis 
Black jackrabbit, Lepus insularis 
Alaskan hare, Lepus othus  
White-tailed jackrabbit, Lepus townsendii  
Volcano rabbit, Romerolagus diazi 
Swamp rabbit, Sylvilagus aquaticus  
Desert cottontail, Sylvilagus audubonii  
Brush rabbit, Sylvilagus bachmani  
Tapeti, Sylvilagus brasiliensis 
Mexican cottontail, Sylvilagus cunicularius 
Dice's cottontail, Sylvilagus dicei 
Eastern cottontail, Sylvilagus floridanus  
Tres Marias cottontail, Sylvilagus graysoni 
Central American tapetí, Sylvilagus gabbi 
Robust cottontail, Sylvilagus holzneri   and:
Manzano Mountain cottontail, Sylvilagus cognatus   (formerly in Sylvilagus floridanus)
Robust cottontail, Sylvilagus (holzneri) robustus 
Northern tapetí, Sylvilagus incitatus 
Omilteme cottontail, Sylvilagus insonus 
San José brush rabbit, Sylvilagus mansuetus 
Marsh rabbit, Sylvilagus palustris  
(Lower Keys marsh rabbit,)
Mountain cottontail, Sylvilagus nuttallii  
Appalachian cottontail, Sylvilagus obscurus  
New England cottontail, Sylvilagus transitionalis

Ochotonidae
Collared pika, Ochotona collaris  
American pika, Ochotona princeps  
Giant pika, Ochotona whartoni  (E)

Eulipotyphla (moles and shrews)

Talpidae (moles)

Star-nosed mole, Condylura cristata  
Hairy-tailed mole, Parascalops breweri  
Eastern mole, Scalopus aquaticus  
Northern broad-footed mole, Scapanus latimanus   and:
Southern broad-footed mole, Scapanus occultus 
Mexican mole, Scapanus anthonyi 
Coast mole, Scapanus orarius  
Townsend's mole, Scapanus townsendii  
American shrew mole, Neurotrichus gibbsii

Soricidae (shrews)

Northern short-tailed shrew, Blarina brevicauda  
Southern short-tailed shrew, Blarina carolinensis   and:
Sherman's short-tailed shrew, Blarina shermani 
Everglades short-tailed shrew, Blarina peninsulae  
Elliot's short-tailed shrew, Blarina hylophaga  
Central Mexican broad-clawed shrew, Cryptotis alticola 
Santa Barbara broad-clawed shrew, Cryptotis cavatorculus  
Celaque broad-clawed shrew, Cryptotis celaque  
Cucurucho broad-clawed shrew, Cryptotis eckerlini 
Enders's small-eared shrew, Cryptotis endersi 
Talamancan small-eared shrew, Cryptotis gracilis 
Goldman's broad-clawed shrew, Cryptotis goldmani 
Goodwin's broad-clawed shrew, Cryptotis goodwini  and:
Honduran broad-clawed shrew, Cryptotis magnimanus 
Guatemalan broad-clawed shrew, Cryptotis griseoventris 
Honduran small-eared shrew, Cryptotis hondurensis  
Lacandona small-eared shrew, Cryptotis lacandonensis 
Muscular broad-clawed shrew, Cryptotis lacertosus  
Big mexican small-eared shrew, Cryptotis magnus  
Mam broad-clawed shrew, Cryptotis mam  
Mataquescuintla broad-clawed shrew, Cryptotis matsoni 
Yucatan small-eared shrew, Cryptotis mayensis 
Omoa broad-clawed shrew, Cryptotis mccarthyi  
Merriam's small-eared shrew, Cryptotis merriami 
Darien small-eared shrew, Cryptotis merus  
Small Mexican small-eared shrew, Cryptotis mexicanus 
Montecristo broad-clawed shrew, Cryptotis montecristo 
Monteverde small-eared shrew, Cryptotis monteverdensis 
Nelson's small-eared shrew, Cryptotis nelsoni 
Blackish small-eared shrew, Cryptotis nigrescens  
Grizzled Mexican small-eared shrew, Cryptotis obscura 
Central american least shrew, Cryptotis orophilus  
Tropical small-eared shrew, Cryptotis tropicalis 
North american least shrew, Cryptotis parvus   and:
Berlandier's least shrew, Cryptotis berlandieri 
Puebla least shrew, Cryptotis pueblensis 
Mexican least shrew, Cryptotis soricinus 
Muscular broad-clawed shrew, Cryptotis lacertosus  
Grizzled small-eared shrew, Cryptotis obscurus 
Highland broad-clawed shrew, Cryptotis oreoryctes  
Oaxacan broad-clawed shrew, Cryptotis peregrinus 
Phillips's small-eared shrew, Cryptotis phillipsii  
Mexican shrew, Megasorex gigas  
Cockrum's gray shrew, Notiosorex cockrumi  
Crawford's gray shrew, Notiosorex crawfordi   and:
Ticul's gray shrew, Notiosorex tataticuli 
Large-eared gray shrew, Notiosorex evotis  
Villa's gray shrew, Notiosorex villai  
Alto shrew, Sorex altoensis 
Arctic shrew, Sorex arcticus  
Arizona shrew, Sorex arizonae  
Marsh shrew, Sorex bendirii  
Cinereus shrew, Sorex cinereus   and:
Maryland shrew, Sorex fontinalis 
Olympic shrew, Sorex rohweri  
Cruz's long-tailed shrew, Sorex cruzi 
Long-tailed shrew, Sorex dispar   and:
Gaspé shrew, Sorex gaspensis
Zacatecas shrew, Sorex emarginatus  
Smoky shrew, Sorex fumeus  
Prairie shrew, Sorex haydeni  
American pygmy shrew, Sorex hoyi   and:
Western pygmy shrew, Sorex eximius 
Ixtlan shrew, Sorex ixtlanensis  
Saint Lawrence Island shrew, Sorex jacksoni  
Southeastern shrew, Sorex longirostris  
Mount Lyell shrew, Sorex lyelli  
Mexican large-toothed shrew, Sorex macrodon  
Sierra shrew, Sorex madrensis 
Maritime shrew, Sorex maritimensis  
Mccarthy's shrew, Sorex mccarthyi 
Merriam's shrew, Sorex merriami  
Eurasian least shrew, Sorex minutissimus  or:
Alaska tiny shrew, Sorex yukonicus  
Carmen Mountain shrew, Sorex milleri  
Southern montane shrew, Sorex monticola   and:
Northern montane shrew, Sorex obscurus 
New Mexico shrew, Sorex neomexicanus  
Mutable shrew, Sorex mutabilis 
Dwarf shrew, Sorex nanus  
Mexican long-tailed shrew, Sorex oreopolus  
Orizaba long-tailed shrew, Sorex orizabae  
Ornate shrew, Sorex ornatus  
Pacific shrew, Sorex pacificus   and:
Baird's shrew, Sorex bairdi  
American water shrew, Sorex palustris   and:
Eastern water shrew, Sorex albibarbis 
Western water shrew, Sorex navigator  and:
Glacier Bay water shrew, Sorex alaskanus   
Preble's shrew, Sorex preblei  
Pribilof Island shrew, Sorex pribilofensis  
Salvin's shrew, Sorex salvini 
Saussure's shrew, Sorex saussurei  and:
Jalisco shrew, Sorex mediopua  
Sclater's shrew, Sorex sclateri 
Fog shrew, Sorex sonomae  
San Cristobal shrew, Sorex stizodon 
Inyo shrew, Sorex tenellus  
Trowbridge's shrew, Sorex trowbridgii  
Tundra shrew, Sorex tundrensis  
Barren ground shrew, Sorex ugyunak  
Vagrant shrew, Sorex vagrans  
Chestnut-bellied shrew, Sorex ventralis  
Veracruz shrew, Sorex veraecrucis 
Verapaz shrew, Sorex veraepacis  and:
Chiapan shrew, Sorex chiapensis 
Ibarra's shrew, Sorex ibarrai

Solenodontidae
Cuban solenodon, Atopogale cubana 
Giant solenodon, Solenodon arredondoi (E) 
Marcano's solenodon, Solenodon marcanoi (E) 
Hispaniolan solenodon, Solenodon paradoxus

Nesophontidae
Puerto Rican nesophontes, Nesophontes edithae (E) 
Nesophontes hemicingulus (E)
Atalaye nesophontes, Nesophontes hypomicrus (E) 
Slender Cuban nesophontes, Nesophontes longirostris (E)
Greater Cuban nesophontes, Nesophontes major (E) 
Western Cuban nesophontes, Nesophontes micrus (E) 
St. Michel nesophontes, Nesophontes paramicrus (E) 
Lesser Cuban nesophontes, Nesophontes submicrus (E)
Cuban nesophontes, Nesophontes superstes (E)
Haitian nesophontes, Nesophontes zamicrus (E)

Chiroptera (bats)

Molossidae (free-tailed bats)
Freeman's dog-faced bat, Cynomops freemani 
Greenhall's dog-faced bat, Cynomops greenhalli 
Mexican dog-faced bat, Cynomops mexicanus 
Southern dog-faced bat, Cynomops planirostris 
Black bonneted bat, Eumops auripendulus  
Wagner's mastiff bat, Eumops glaucinus   and:
Florida bonneted bat, Eumops floridanus   
Fierce bonneted bat, Eumops ferox  
Sanborn's bonneted bat, Eumops hansae  
Northern dwarf bonneted bat, Eumops nanus  
Western mastiff bat, Eumops perotis  
Underwood's mastiff bat, Eumops underwoodi  
Alvarez's mastiff bat, Molossus alvarezi  
Aztec mastiff bat, Molossus aztecus  
Bonda mastiff bat, Molossus bondae  
Coiban mastiff bat, Molossus coibensis  
Pallas's mastiff bat, Molossus molossus   and:
Pug-nosed mastiff bat, Molossus milleri (Bermuda) 
Hispaniolan mastiff bat, Molossus verrilli 
Common black mastiff bat, Molossus rufus   (Trinidad and Tobago), and:
Northern black mastiff bat, Molossus nigricans 
Miller's mastiff bat, Molossus pretiosus  
Sinaloan mastiff bat, Molossus sinaloae  
Least little mastiff bat, Mormopterus minutus  
Pocketed free-tailed bat, Nyctinomops femorosaccus  
Peale's free-tailed bat, Nyctinomops aurispinosus 
Broad-eared bat, Nyctinomops laticaudatus 
Big free-tailed bat, Nyctinomops macrotis  
Big crested mastiff bat, Promops centralis 
Brown mastiff bat, Promops nasutus   (Trinidad and Tobago)
Mexican free-tailed bat, Tadarida brasiliensis

Emballonuridae (sac-winged bats)
Thomas's sac-winged bat, Balantiopteryx io 
Gray sac-winged bat, Balantiopteryx plicata 
Thomas's shaggy bat, Centronycteris centralis 
Chestnut sac-winged bat, Cormura brevirostris 
Short-eared bat, Cyttarops Alecto 
Northern ghost bat, Diclidurus albus 
Greater dog-like bat, Peropteryx kappleri 
Lesser doglike bat, Peropteryx macrotis 
Trinidad dog-like bat, Peropteryx trinitatis  
Proboscis bat, Rhynchonycteris naso 
Greater sac-winged bat, Saccopteryx bilineata 
Lesser sac-winged bat, Saccopteryx leptura

Natalidae (funnel-eared bats)
Caribbean lesser funnel-eared bat, Chilonatalus micropus   and:
Cuban lesser funnel-eared bat, Chilonatalus macer  
Bahamian lesser funnel-eared bat, Chilonatalus tumidifrons  
Jamaican greater funnel-eared bat, Natalus jamaicensis  
Hispaniolan greater funnel-eared bat, Natalus major  
Mexican greater funnel-eared bat, Natalus mexicanus  and:
Woolly funnel-eared bat, Natalus lanatus 
Cuban greater funnel-eared bat, Natalus primus  
Lesser Antillean funnel-eared bat, Natalus stramineus  
Trinidadian funnel-eared bat, Natalus tumidirostris   (Bonaire, Curaçao and Trinidad and Tobago)
Gervais's funnel-eared bat, Nyctiellus lepidus

Vespertilionidae

Hoary bat, Aeorestes cinereus   and:
Hawaiian hoary bat, Aeorestes semotus 
Big red bat, Aeorestes egregius 
Pallid bat, Antrozous pallidus  
Van Gelder's bat, Bauerus dubiaquercus 
Brazilian brown bat, Eptesicus brasiliensis 
Argentine brown bat, Eptesicus furinalis 
Big brown bat, Eptesicus fuscus  
Spotted bat, Euderma maculatum  
Mexican big-eared bat, Corynorhinus mexicanus  
Rafinesque's big-eared bat, Corynorhinus rafinesquii  
Townsend's big-eared bat, Corynorhinus townsendii   
(ssp. C. t. virginianus and C. t. ingens)
Southern yellow bat, Dasypterus ega  
Cuban yellow bat, Dasypterus insularis 
Northern yellow bat, Dasypterus intermedius  
Western yellow bat, Dasypterus xanthinus  
Chiriquinan serotine, Eptesicus chiriquinus  
Allen's big-eared bat, Idionycteris phyllotis  
Eastern red bat, Lasiurus borealis  
Tacarcunan bat, Lasiurus castaneus  
Southern red bat, Lasiurus blossevillii     (Trinidad and Tobago), and:
Desert red bat, Lasiurus frantzii 
Jamaican red bat, Lasiurus degelidus  
Minor red bat, Lasiurus minor  
Pfeiffer's red bat, Lasiurus pfeifferi  
Seminole bat, Lasiurus seminolus  
Sir David Attenborough's myotis, Myotis attenboroughi  (Trinidad and Tobago)
Armién's myotis, Myotis armiensis 
Silver-tipped myotis, Myotis albescens 
Southwestern myotis, Myotis auriculus  
Southeastern myotis, Myotis austroriparius  
California myotis, Myotis californicus  
Western small-footed myotis, Myotis ciliolabrum   and:
Dark-nosed small-footed myotis, Myotis melanorhinus  
Guatemalan myotis, Myotis cobanensis 
Dominican myotis, Myotis dominicensis  
Long-eared myotis, Myotis evotis  
Elegant myotis, Myotis elegans 
Findley's myotis, Myotis findleyi  
Cinnamon myotis, Myotis fortidens 
Gray bat, Myotis grisescens   
Keen's myotis, Myotis keenii  
Eastern small-footed myotis, Myotis leibii  
Little brown bat, Myotis lucifugus  
Schwartz's myotis, Myotis martiniquensis   and:
Barbados myotis, Myotis nyctor  
Curaçao Myotis, Myotis nesopolus   (Aruba?, Curaçao and Bonaire)
Common black myotis, Myotis nigricans   and:
Carter's myotis, Myotis carteri 
Montane myotis, Myotis oxyotus  
Northern hairy-legged myotis, Myotis pilosatibialis 
Flat-headed myotis, Myotis planiceps  
Riparian myotis, Myotis riparius  
Northern long-eared myotis, Myotis septentrionalis  
Indiana bat, Myotis sodalis   
Fringed myotis, Myotis thysanodes  
Cave myotis, Myotis velifer  
Fish-eating myotis, Myotis vivesi  
Long-legged myotis, Myotis volans  
Yuma myotis, Myotis yumanensis  
Silver-haired bat, Lasionycteris noctivagans  
Arizona myotis, Myotis occultus  
Cuban evening bat, Nycticeius cubanus  
Evening bat, Nycticeius humeralis  
Canyon bat, Parastrellus hesperus  
Tricolored bat, Perimyotis subflavus  
Mexican big-eared bat, Plecotus mexicanus 
Yucatan yellow bat, Rhogeessa aenea  
Allen's yellow bat, Rhogeessa alleni 
Bickham's yellow bat, Rhogeessa bickhami  
Genoways's yellow bat, Rhogeessa genowaysi 
Slender yellow bat, Rhogeessa gracilis 
Thomas's yellow bat, Rhogeessa io 
Menchu's yellow bat, Rhogeessa menchuae  
Least yellow bat, Rhogeessa mira  
Little yellow bat, Rhogeessa parvula 
Nicaraguan little yellow bat, Rhogeessa permutandis 
Black-winged little yellow bat, Rhogeessa tumida

Mormoopidae
Antillean ghost-faced bat, Mormoops blainvillei  
Ghost-faced bat, Mormoops megalophylla  
Davy's naked-backed bat, Pteronotus davyi  and:
Thomas's naked-backed bat, Pteronotus fulvus 
Big naked-backed bat, Pteronotus gymnonotus 
Parnell's mustached bat, Pteronotus parnellii  and:
Allen's common mustached bat, Pteronotus fuscus 
Mesoamerican common mustached bat, Pteronotus mesoamericanus  
Puerto rican common mustached bat, Pteronotus portoricensis 
Mexican common mustached bat, Pteronotus mexicanus 
Hispaniolan common mustached bat, Pteronotus pusillus 
Pristine mustached bat, Pteronotus pristinus (E) 
Macleay's mustached bat, Pteronotus macleayii  
Wagner's mustached bat, Pteronotus personatus  and:
Dobson's lesser mustached bat, Pteronotus psilotis 
Sooty mustached bat, Pteronotus quadridens

Furipteridae
Thumbless bat, Furipterus horrens

Noctilionidae (bulldog bats)
Lesser bulldog bat, Noctilio albiventris 
Greater bulldog bat, Noctilio leporinus

Phyllostomidae (New World leaf-nosed bats)

Brachyphyllinae
Antillean fruit-eating bat, Brachyphylla cavernarum  
Cuban fruit-eating bat, Brachyphylla nana

Carolliinae
Silky short-tailed bat, Carollia brevicaudum  
Chestnut short-tailed bat, Carollia castanea 
Seba's short-tailed bat, Carollia perspicillata 
Sowell's short-tailed bat, Carollia sowelli 
Gray short-tailed bat, Carollia subrufa

Desmodontinae (vampire bats)
Stock's vampire bat, Desmodus stocki (E)
Common vampire bat, Desmodus rotundus 
White-winged vampire bat, Diaemus youngii  
Hairy-legged vampire bat, Diphylla ecaudata

Glossophaginae
Handley's tailless bat, Anoura cultrata 
Geoffroy's tailless bat, Anoura geoffroyi 
Godman's long-tailed bat, Choeroniscus godmani 
Mexican long-tongued bat, Choeronycteris mexicana  
Lesser long-tailed bat, Choeroniscus minor   (Trinidad and Tobago)
Commissaris's long-tongued bat, Glossophaga commissarisi 
Gray long-tongued bat, Glossophaga leachii 
Miller's long-tongued bat, Glossophaga longirostris  
Western long-tongued bat, Glossophaga morenoi 
Pallas's long-tongued bat, Glossophaga soricina   (Trinidad and Tobago), and:
Jamaican long-tongued bat, Glossophaga antillarum 
Merriam's long-tongued bat, Glossophaga mutica 
Thomas's nectar bat, Hsunycteris thomasi  
Underwood's long-tongued bat, Hylonycteris underwoodi 
Southern long-nosed bat, Leptonycteris curasoae   (Aruba, Curaçao and Bonaire)
Mexican long-nosed bat, Leptonycteris nivalis   
Lesser long-nosed bat, Leptonycteris yerbabuenae  
Dark long-tongued bat, Lichonycteris obscura 
Chestnut long-tongued bat, Lionycteris spurrelli  
Goldman's nectar bat, Lonchophylla concava 
Godman's nectar bat, Lonchophylla mordax 
Orange nectar bat, Lonchophylla robusta 
Insular single-leaf bat, Monophyllus plethodon  
Leach's single leaf bat, Monophyllus redmani 
Banana bat, Musonycteris harrisoni

Phyllonycterinae
Brown flower bat, Erophylla bombifrons  
Buffy flower bat, Erophylla sezekorni  
Jamaican flower bat, Phyllonycteris aphylla 
Puerto Rican flower bat, Phyllonycteris major (E)
Cuban flower bat, Phyllonycteris poeyi

Phyllostominae
Big-eared woolly bat, Chrotopterus auritus 
Striped hairy-nosed bat, Gardnerycteris crenulatum   (Trinidad and Tobago)
Keenan's hairy-nosed bat, Gardnerycteris keenani 
Davies's big-eared bat, Glyphonycteris daviesi 
Tricolored big-eared bat, Glyphonycteris sylvestris 
Yellow-throated big-eared bat, Lampronycteris brachyotis 
Tomes's sword-nosed bat, Lonchorhina aurita 
Pygmy round-eared bat, Lophostoma brasiliense   (Trinidad and Tobago), and:
Mesoamerican round-eared bat, Lophostoma nicaraguae 
Kalko's round-eared bat, Lophostoma kalkoae  
Davis's round-eared bat, Lophostoma evotis 
White-throated round-eared bat, Lophostoma silvicola  
Long-legged bat, Macrophyllum macrophyllum 
California leaf-nosed bat, Macrotus californicus  
Waterhouse's leaf-nosed bat, Macrotus waterhousii  
Saint Vincent big-eared bat, Micronycteris buriri  
Hairy big-eared bat, Micronycteris hirsuta  
Little big-eared bat, Micronycteris megalotis  
Common big-eared bat, Micronycteris microtis 
White-bellied big-eared bat, Micronycteris minuta 
Schmidts's big-eared bat, Micronycteris schmidtorum 
Northern big-eared bat, Micronycteris tresamici 
Cozumelan golden bat, Mimon cozumelae 
Pale-faced bat, Phylloderma stenops 
Pale spear-nosed bat, Phyllostomus discolor 
Greater spear-nosed bat, Phyllostomus hastatus 
Stripe-headed round-eared bat, Tonatia saurophila  and:
Northern stripe-headed round-eared bat, Tonatia bakeri 
Southern stripe-headed round-eared bat, Tonatia maresi  (Trinidad and Tobago)
Fringe-lipped bat, Trachops cirrhosus 
Niceforo's big-eared bat, Trinycteris nicefori 
Spectral bat, Vampyrum spectrum

Stenodermatinae
Little white-shouldered bat, Ametrida centurio 
Tree bat, Ardops nichollsi 
Jamaican fig-eating bat, Ariteus flavescens  
Hairy fruit-eating bat, Artibeus hirsutus  
Honduran fruit-eating bat, Artibeus inopinatus 
Jamaican fruit bat, Artibeus jamaicensis  and:
Flat-faced fruit-eating bat, Artibeus planirostris  
Schwartz's fruit-eating bat, Artibeus schwartzi  
Great fruit-eating bat, Artibeus lituratus  and:
Intermediate fruit-eating bat, Artibeus intermedius 
Wrinkle-faced bat, Centurio senex 
Guadeloupean big-eyed bat, Chiroderma improvisum  
Salvin's big-eyed bat, Chiroderma salvini  and:
Mexican big-eyed bat, Chiroderma scopaeum 
Little big-eyed bat, Chiroderma trinitatum   (Trinidad and Tobago), and:
Handley's big-eyed bat, Chiroderma gorgasi 
Hairy big-eyed bat, Chiroderma villosum 
Aztec fruit-eating bat, Dermanura azteca 
Bogota fruit-eating bat, Dermanura bogotensis  
Pygmy fruit-eating bat, Dermanura phaeotis 
Toltec fruit-eating bat, Dermanura tolteca 
Thomas's fruit-eating bat, Dermanura watsoni 
Honduran white bat, Ectophylla alba 
Velvety fruit-eating bat, Enchisthenes hartii  
MacConnell's bat, Mesophylla macconnelli 
Cuban fig-eating bat, Phyllops falcatus  
Darien broad-nosed bat, Platyrrhinus aquilus  
Choco broad-nosed bat Platyrrhinus chocoensis 
Thomas's broad-nosed bat, Platyrrhinus dorsalis 
Brown-bellied broad-nosed bat, Platyrrhinus fusciventris   (Trinidad and Tobago)
Heller's broad-nosed bat, Platyrrhinus helleri 
Greater broad-nosed bat, Platyrrhinus vittatus 
Red fruit bat, Stenoderma rufum  
Gianna's yellow-shouldered bat, Sturnira giannae  (Trinidad and Tobago)
Little yellow-shouldered bat, Sturnira lilium  and:
Dominica yellow-shouldered bat, Sturnira angeli  
Northern yellow-shouldered bat, Sturnira parvidens  
Paulson's yellow-shouldered bat, Sturnira paulsoni  
Burton's yellow-shouldered bat, Sturnira burtonlimi  
Highland yellow-shouldered bat, Sturnira ludovici  and:
Honduran yellow-shouldered bat, Sturnira hondurensis  
Louis's yellow-shouldered bat, Sturnira luisi 
Talamancan yellow-shouldered bat, Sturnira mordax 
Tilda's yellow-shouldered bat, Sturnira tildae   (Trinidad and Tobago)
Common tent-making bat, Uroderma bilobatum   and: (Trinidad and Tobago)
Pacific tent-making bat, Uroderma convexum 
Davis's tent-making bat, Uroderma davisi 
Brown tent-making bat, Uroderma magnirostrum 
Kalko's yellow-eared bat, Vampyressa elisabethae 
Northern little yellow-eared bat, Vampyressa thyone  
Striped yellow-eared bat, Vampyriscus nymphaea  
Caracciolo's stripe-faced bat, Vampyrodes caraccioli   (Trinidad and Tobago), and:
Great stripe-faced bat, Vampyrodes major

Thyropteridae
Peters's disk-winged bat, Thyroptera discifera 
Spix's disk-winged bat, Thyroptera tricolor

Carnivora (carnivorans)

Felidae (cats)

Jaguarundi, Herpailurus yagouaroundi  
Homotherium serum (E)
Ocelot, Leopardus pardalis   
Oncilla, Leopardus tigrinus 
Margay, Leopardus wiedii  
Canada lynx, Lynx canadensis   
Bobcat, Lynx rufus  
Miracinonyx inexpectatus (E)
Miracinonyx trumani (E)
Panthera atrox (E)
Jaguar, Panthera onca   
Panthera spelaea (E)
Cougar, Puma concolor   
(ssp. P. c. couguar )
Smilodon fatalis (E)

Canidae (dogs)

Dire wolf, Aenocyon dirus  (E)
Armbruster's wolf, Canis armbrusteri (E)
Coyote, Canis latrans  
Gray wolf, Canis lupus    (and )
Eastern wolf, Canis lycaon 
Red wolf, Canis rufus  
Crab-eating fox, Cerdocyon thous  
Dhole, Cuon alpinus (Ex)  
Bush dog, Speothos venaticus 
Gray fox, Urocyon cinereoargenteus  
Island fox, Urocyon littoralis  
(ssp. U.l. littoralis, U. l. catalinae, U. l. santarosae and U. l. santacruzae)
Arctic fox, Vulpes lagopus  
Kit fox, Vulpes macrotis  
Swift fox, Vulpes velox  
Red fox, Vulpes vulpes

Ursidae (bears)
Short-faced bear, Arctodus simus  (E)
Florida cave bear, Tremarctos floridanus (E)
Brown bear, Ursus arctos   (includes grizzly bear, U. a. horribilis: ,  andAlaskan brown bear or Kodiak bear, U. a. middendorffi)
American black bear, Ursus americanus   (Louisiana black bear U. a. luteolus)
Polar bear, Ursus maritimus

Procyonidae
Northern olingo, Bassaricyon gabbii 
Western lowland olingo, Bassaricyon medius 
Ringtail, Bassariscus astutus  
Cacomistle, Bassariscus sumichrasti 
White-nosed coati, Nasua narica  
Kinkajou, Potos flavus 
Crab-eating raccoon, Procyon cancrivorus 
Raccoon, Procyon lotor  
Cozumel raccoon, Procyon pygmaeus

Mustelidae

Tayra, Eira barbara 
Sea otter, Enhydra lutris  
(ssp. E. l. nereis and E. l. kenyoni: , ssp. E. l. nereis also )
Greater grison, Galictis vittata 
Wolverine, Gulo gulo  
North American river otter, Lontra canadensis  
Neotropical otter, Lontra longicaudis 
American marten, Martes americana   and:
Pacific marten, Martes caurina  
Beringian ermine, Mustela erminea   and:
Haida ermine, Mustela haidarum  
American ermine, Mustela richardsonii  
Least weasel, Mustela nivalis  
Black-footed ferret, Mustela nigripes    (and )
Long-tailed weasel, Neogale frenata  
Sea mink, Neogale macrodon  (E)  
American mink, Neogale vison   
Fisher, Pekania pennanti  
American badger, Taxidea taxus

Mephitidae
Short-faced skunk, Brachyprotoma obtusata (E)
American hog-nosed skunk, Conepatus leuconotus  
Striped hog-nosed skunk, Conepatus semistriatus 
Striped skunk, Mephitis mephitis  
Hooded skunk, Mephitis macroura  
Southern spotted skunk, Spilogale angustifrons  and:
Yucatán spotted skunk, Spilogale yucatanensis 
Western spotted skunk, Spilogale gracilis   and:
Desert spotted skunk, Spilogale leucoparia 
Alleghanian spotted skunk, Spilogale putorius   and:
Plains spotted skunk, Spilogale interrupta 
Pygmy spotted skunk, Spilogale pygmaea

Otariidae (eared seals)
Galápagos fur seal, Arctocephalus galapagoensis   (A)
Guadalupe fur seal, Arctocephalus townsendi   
Northern fur seal, Callorhinus ursinus  
Steller sea lion, Eumetopias jubatus  
(ssp. E. j. monteriensis: , ssp. E. j. jubatus)  (except west of 144° W, where )
California sea lion, Zalophus californianus  
Galápagos sea lion, Zalophus wollebaeki   (A)

Odobenidae
Walrus, Odobenus rosmarus   (O. r. divergens , O. r. rosmarus )

Phocidae (earless seals)

Hooded seal, Cystophora cristata  
Bearded seal, Erignathus barbatus  (E. b. barbatus, nauticus and monteriensis , jubatus )
Ribbon seal, Histriophoca fasciata  
Grey seal, Halichoerus grypus   (H. g. grypus )
Northern elephant seal, Mirounga angustirostris  
Caribbean monk seal, Neomonachus tropicalis  (E) 
Harbor seal, Phoca vitulina  (P. v. concolor and richardii , mellonae , stejnegeri )
Spotted seal, Phoca largha   
Ringed seal, Pusa hispida   (P. h. hispida )
Harp seal, Pagophilus groenlandicus

Perissodactyla (odd-toed ungulates)

Equidae (horse family)
Equus alaskae (E)
Mexican horse, Equus conversidens  (E)
Equus fraternus (E)
Giant horse, Equus giganteus (E)
Yukon wild horse, Equus lambei (E)
Niobrara horse, Equus niobrarensis (E)
Western horse, Equus occidentalis (E)
Equus semiplicatus (E)
Scott's horse, Equus scotti (E)
Hagerman horse, Equus simplicidens (E)
Stilt-legged horse, Haringtonhippus francisci (E)

Tapiridae (tapirs)
Baird's tapir, Tapirus bairdii 
Cope's tapir, Tapirus copei (E)
California tapir, Tapirus californicus (E)
Merriam's tapir, Tapirus merriami (E)
Florida tapir, Tapirus veroensis (E)

Artiodactyla (even-toed ungulates)

Camelidae
Camelops hesternus   (E)
Camelops kansanus (E)
Camelops minidokae (E)
Stilt-legged llama, Hemiauchenia macrocephala (E)
Stout-legged llama, Palaeolama mirifica (E)

Tayassuidae
Long-nosed peccary, Mylohyus nasutus  (E)
Collared peccary, Dicotyles tajacu  
Flat-headed peccary, Platygonus compressus  (E)
White-lipped peccary, Tayassu pecari

Bovidae (bovines)

Ancient bison, Bison antiquus (E)
American bison, Bison bison   (Wood bison,)
Giant bison, Bison latifrons (E)
Bison occidentalis  (E)
Steppe wisent, Bison priscus (E)
Harlan's muskox, Bootherium bombifrons  (E)
Shrub-ox, Euceratherium collinum  (E)
Muskox, Ovibos moschatus  
Mountain goat, Oreamnos americanus  
Harrington's mountain goat, Oreamnos harringtoni  (E)
Bighorn sheep, Ovis canadensis  
(Desert bighorn sheep, O. c. nelsoni and Sierra Nevada bighorn sheep,)
Dall sheep, Ovis dalli  
Giant muskox, Praeovibos priscus (E)
Saiga antelope, Saiga tatarica (Ex)  
(ssp. S. t. tatarica: , ssp. S. t. mongolica )
Soergel's ox, Soergelia mayfieldi (E)

Cervidae (deer)
Moose, Alces alces  
Stag-moose, Cervalces scotti  (E)
Elk (wapiti), Cervus canadensis  
Eastern elk, C. c. canadensis (E) 
Merriam's elk, C. c. merriami (E) 
Common red brocket, Mazama americana   (Trinidad and Tobago)
Amazonian brown brocket, Mazama nemorivaga 
Central American red brocket, Mazama temama 
Mule deer, Odocoileus hemionus  
American mountain deer, Odocoileus lucasi (E)
Yucatan brown brocket, Odocoileus pandora 
White-tailed deer, Odocoileus virginianus   
(Columbian white-tailed deer, O. v. leucurus and Key deer,)
Caribou, Rangifer tarandus  
(Migratory woodland caribou,)

Antilocapridae
Pronghorn, Antilocapra americana   (A. a. peninsularis and sonoriensis )
(Baja California pronghorn, A. a. peninsularis: , Sonoran pronghorn,)
Pacific pronghorn, Antilocapra pacifica (E)
Dwarf pronghorn, Capromeryx minor (E)
Barbour's pronghorn, Hayoceros barbouri (E)
Shuler's pronghorn, Tetrameryx shuleri (E)
Conkling's pronghorn, Stockoceros conklingi (E)

Cetacea

Delphinidae (oceanic dolphins)

White-beaked dolphin, Lagenorhynchus albirostris  
Atlantic white-sided dolphin, Leucopleurus acutus  
Rough-toothed dolphin, Steno bredanensis  
Striped dolphin, Stenella coeruleoalba  
Atlantic spotted dolphin, Stenella frontalis  
Spinner dolphin, Stenella longirostris  
Clymene dolphin, Stenella clymene  
Pantropical spotted dolphin, Stenella attenuata  
Short-beaked common dolphin, Delphinus delphis   and:
Long-beaked common dolphin, Delphinus capensis  
Common bottlenose dolphin, Tursiops truncatus  
Fraser's dolphin, Lagenodelphis hosei  
Northern right whale dolphin, Lissodelphis borealis  
Pacific white-sided dolphin, Sagmatias obliquidens  
False killer whale, Pseudorca crassidens  
Vaquita, Phocoena sinus 
Guiana dolphin, Sotalia guianensis 
Killer whale, Orcinus orca   
Risso's dolphin, Grampus griseus  
Long-finned pilot whale, Globicephala melas  
Short-finned pilot whale, Globicephala macrorhynchus  
Pygmy killer whale, Feresa attenuata  
Melon-headed whale, Peponocephala electra

Monodontidae
Beluga, Delphinapterus leucas   
Narwhal, Monodon monoceros

Phocoenidae (porpoises)
Harbor porpoise, Phocoena phocoena  
Dall's porpoise, Phocoenoides dalli

Kogiidae
Pygmy sperm whale, Kogia breviceps  
Dwarf sperm whale, Kogia sima  (Hawaiian Islands only)

Physeteridae
Sperm whale, Physeter macrocephalus

Ziphiidae (beaked whales)

Giant beaked whale, Berardius bairdii   (collective name for two species - Baird's beaked whale and Arnoux's beaked whale)
Least beaked whale, Berardius minimus  
Gervais' beaked whale, Mesoplodon europaeus  
Blainville's beaked whale, Mesoplodon densirostris  
True's beaked whale, Mesoplodon mirus  
Sowerby's beaked whale, Mesoplodon bidens  
Stejneger's beaked whale, Mesoplodon stejnegeri  
Ginkgo-toothed beaked whale, Mesoplodon ginkgodens  
Hubbs' beaked whale, Mesoplodon carlhubbsi  
Perrin's beaked whale, Mesoplodon perrini  
Hector's beaked whale, Mesoplodon hectori  (A) 
Pygmy beaked whale, Mesoplodon peruvianus  (A) 
Tropical bottlenose whale, Indopacetus pacificus  
Northern bottlenose whale, Hyperoodon ampullatus  
Cuvier's beaked whale, Ziphius cavirostris

Eschrichtiidae (gray whales)
Gray whale, Eschrichtius robustus

Balaenopteridae (rorquals)
Blue whale, Balaenoptera musculus   
(ssp. brevicauda - pygmy blue whale: , ssp. musculus North Pacific stock: , ssp. musculus North Atlantic stock)
Fin whale, Balaenoptera physalus   
Sei whale, Balaenoptera borealis   
Common minke whale, Balaenoptera acutorostrata  
Bryde's whale (Balaenoptera edeni) (A)  or:
Bryde's whale, Balaenoptera brydei
Rice's whale, Balaenoptera ricei 
Humpback whale, Megaptera novaeangliae

Balaenidae
Bowhead whale, Balaena mysticetus    (Bering-Chukchi-Beaufort Sea subpopulation: , Svalbard-Barents Sea (Spitsbergen) subpopulation)
North Atlantic right whale, Eubalaena glacialis   
North Pacific right whale, Eubalaena japonica  (A) (Alaska)  

Sirenia (sea cows)

Trichechidae
West Indian manatee, Trichechus manatus   
(ssp. T. m. manatus - Antillean or Caribbean manatee: , ssp. T. m. latirostris - Florida manatee)

Dugongidae
Steller's sea cow, Hydrodamalis gigas  (E)

Proboscidea

Elephantidae
Columbian mammoth, Mammuthus columbi  (E)
Pygmy mammoth, Mammuthus exilis  (E)
Woolly mammoth, Mammuthus primigenius  (E)

Mammutidae
American mastodon, Mammut americanum  (E)

Gomphothere
Cuvieronius hyodon (E)
Stegomastodon aftoniae (E)
Stegomastodon mirificus (E)
Stegomastodon nebrascensis (E)
Stegomastodon primitivus (E)

Introduced mammals

Echimyidae -  Echimyinae, Myocastorini
Nutria, Myocastor coypus  (I)

Muridae
House mouse, Mus musculus  (I) 
Norway rat, Rattus norvegicus  (I) 
Black rat, Rattus rattus  (I)

Leporidae (rabbits and hares)
European hare, Lepus europaeus  (I) 
Cape hare, Lepus capensis  (I) 
European rabbit, Oryctolagus cuniculus   (I)

Cercopithecidae (old World monkeys)
Mona monkey, Cercopithecus mona  (I) 
Vervet monkey, Chlorocebus pygerythrus  (I) 
Green monkey, Chlorocebus sabaeus  (I) 
Japanese macaque, Macaca fuscata  (I) 
Rhesus macaque, Macaca mulatta  (I)

Herpestidae (mongoose)
Small Indian mongoose, Urva auropunctata  (I) (Caribbean)

Mustelidae
Beech marten, Martes foina  (I)

Suidae (pigs)
Wild boar, Sus scrofa  (I)

Bovidae (bovines)
Barbary sheep, Ammotragus lervia  (I) 
Blackbuck, Antilope cervicapra  (I) 
Nilgai, Boselaphus tragocamelus  (I) 
Bezoar ibex, Capra aegagrus aegagrus  (I) 
Siberian ibex, Capra sibirica  (I) 
Gemsbok, Oryx gazella  (I)

Cervidae (deer)
Chital, Axis axis  (I) 
Indian hog deer, Axis porcinus  (I) 
Sika deer, Cervus nippon  (I) 
Red deer, Cervus elaphus  (I) 
European fallow deer, Dama dama  (I) 
Sambar, Rusa unicolor  (I)

See also
List of birds of North America
List of mammals of Mexico
Mammals of the Caribbean
List of mammals of Greenland
List of mammals of Central America
List of mammals of South America
Great American Interchange
List of mammal genera
Lists of mammals by region
List of reptiles of North America
List of amphibians of North America
List of U.S. state mammals
List of U.S. state birds
List of U.S. state reptiles
List of U.S. state amphibians

Notes

Species listed in Baker et al. 2003, but omitted in this article: European ferret, Mustela putorius, Himalayan tahr, Hemitragus jemlahicus.

References

Further reading

External links
American Society of Mammalogists
Databases: Division of Mammals: Department of Vertebrate Zoology: NMNH - i.e. printable Field Guide to mammals of North America
Search the Division of Mammals Collections - National Museum of Natural History, Smithsonian Institution
Mammal Species of the World, 3rd edition (MSW3) - database of mammalian taxonomy
IUCN Red List of Threatened Species (Search results: mammalia, North America, 2014-03-29)
Endangered Species Program - US Fish & Wildlife Service
Species Search - US Fish & Wildlife Service
Endangered Species Act - National Marine Fisheries Service - NOAA 
List of Endangered and threatened wildlife - US Government Printing Office

Lists of Western Hemisphere mammals from north to south

'
 
North America
Mammals